Nepalorthogonius monilicornis is a species of beetles in the family Carabidae, the only species in the genus Nepalorthogonius.

References

Orthogoniinae
Monotypic Carabidae genera